Jeimes Menezes de Almeida (born 28 April 2001), known as just Jeimes, is a Brazilian professional footballer who plays as a goalkeeper for Montalegre on loan from Paços de Ferreira.

Professional career
A youth product of the Brazilian club Santos, Jeimes moved to Portugal with Paços de Ferreira in 2019. He joined Montalegre on loan for the 2020–21 season. He signed his first professional contract with Paços de Ferreira on 21 July 2021. He made his professional debut with Paços de Ferreira in a 1-1 Primeira Liga tie with Boavista on 21 January 2022.

References

External links
 

2001 births
Living people
Footballers from Brasília
Brazilian footballers
F.C. Paços de Ferreira players
C.D.C. Montalegre players
Primeira Liga players
Campeonato de Portugal (league) players
Association football goalkeepers
Brazilian expatriate footballers
Expatriate footballers in Portugal
Brazilian expatriate sportspeople in Portugal